DomainKeys (informally DK) is a deprecated e-mail authentication system designed by Yahoo to verify the domain name of an e-mail sender and the message integrity.

Aspects of DomainKeys, along with parts of Identified Internet Mail, were combined to create DomainKeys Identified Mail (DKIM), which is now widely used.

Both DomainKeys and DKIM were published in May 2007, DomainKeys as an "historical" protocol, and DKIM as its standards-track replacement.

See also
 Sender ID
 Author Domain Signing Practices
 Sender Policy Framework (SPF)

References

External links
 DKIM.org (DKIM resources website: implementations, FAQ, news).
 IETF DKIM working group (started 2006).
 Yahoo!'s description of DomainKeys (historical; archived from the original on 2007-10-18).
 Yahoo!'s statement about IPR claimed in DKIM draft
 DomainKey Library and Implementor's Tools (Yahoo!'s historical free software reference implementation of DomainKeys).
 
 SpamCop FAQ: Why are auto responders bad? (FAQ entry about bogus bounces, also discusses DomainKeys).

Email authentication
Cryptographic protocols
Spam filtering
Yahoo! Mail